Demi Monde Bizarros subtitled "Songs about sex, satan and sado-masochism" is the fourth and last album by the Swedish metal band Notre Dame, released with two different covers. The album has 14 songs and it closes with two live tracks, one of them being a cover song, that fit the studio tracks quite well and re-enforce the theatrical atmosphere even more.

Track listing

Credits
 Snowy Shaw - vocals, guitar and keyboard
 Mannekin De Sade - drums
 Vampirella - vocals

References

External links
 http://www.discogs.com/Notre-Dame-Demi-Monde-Bizarros/release/497549

2004 albums